
Francia Lake is a lake in the Beni Department, Bolivia.

References 

Lakes of Beni Department